Zdeněk Sýkora (February 3, 1920 – July 12, 2011) was a Czechoslovakian modern abstract painter and sculptor, and a pioneer of using computers in art.

Early life
Sýkora was born and died in Louny, Czechoslovakia. His style and medium changed from landscape paintings in the late 1940s to geometrical abstract structures in the 50s. Influenced by cubism and surrealism in the 1960s, he became one of the first artists to use computers in creating geometric abstract paintings.
During the Soviet occupations of many countries after World War II, including Czechoslovakia, Sýkora was unable to hold many exhibitions, and some of the only pieces that can be seen from the late 1960s are government building projects.
During this period, the artist spent a great deal of time working in Prague.

Later career
Sýkora's style eventually turned to a less strict system of line paintings with lines of color moving across large canvasses in random directions.

Also in the 1960s, Sýkora was member of the art group Crossroad (Skupina Křižovatka). While in this group, he created his first structures and realizations for architecture in the Prague neighborhood of Letná on Jindřišská Street). In 1985, he began collaborating on paintings with his wife, Lenka Sýkora. Their most recent realization for architecture can be found in the building of flight operation in Jeneč near Prague. Sýkora had his second retrospective exhibition in 1995, 25 years after his first one, which had been held in Špála Gallery in 1970, and was not authorized by the occupying Russians. In 1995, it was the Prague City Gallery that held the exhibition in the Municipal Library and was a cross-section of his work. Sykora remained mostly active up until his death at age 91.

Legacy
Sýkora 's paintings are owned by galleries around the globe, including the Centre Georges Pompidou and the MUMOK in Vienna.

Awards
Vladimír Boudnik Award – 2008 – Czech Republic
Ordre des Arts et des Lettres – France
Herbert-Boeckl-Preis – Austria

Exhibitions
Sýkora had hundreds of exhibitions internationally over his lifetime. A partial list is found on Prague Art & Design.

Associated Czech artists

References
Prague Art Catalogue

External links
 https://web.archive.org/web/20110929162910/http://www.fcca.cz/shared/events/orbisfictus/ofzdeneksykora4.html
Official site

1920 births
2011 deaths
20th-century Czech painters
Czech male painters
Modern painters
Czechoslovak artists
20th-century Czech male artists